Maria Cotescu (sometimes shown as Maria Cottescu or Marica Cottescu) (1896–1980) was one of the first female Romanian architects. She was most prolific in the period between the wars and was one of the few architects of the period whose theoretical design writings were parallel to her design implementation. She is most known for large industrial works, like the Romanian Railway Company's industrial and office project.

Biography
Some sources indicate that she also later attended the Superior School of Architecture in Bucharest, graduating after Henrieta Delavrancea did so in 1926–1927.

She was most prolific building in the era between the wars, and typically built industrial buildings like the 1400 Altitude Hotel in Sinaia, which she worked on between 1931 and 1933 in collaboration with Ilie Teodorescu or the industrial buildings she designed for the Romanian Railway Company in 1933. The CFR project was completed over several years and included work on the Griviţa workshops, CFR offices, power plant and administration building. The Griviţa building was one of the first to use red brick, to be designed in a modern style and to use functional technology, making it a model for later works by other architects. Alexandru Tănăsescu collaborated on the buildings which were constructed between 1933 and 1940.

In addition to design and construction work, Cotescu published articles on architectural theory, which appeared in such journals as Technology Magazine, the Polytechnic Society Bulletin, Architecture and Symmetry Magazine.

Cotescu died in Romania in 1980.

Works
1931–1933 in collaboration with Ilie Teodorescu, 1400 Altitude Hotel in Sinaia.
1933–1940 in collaboration with Alexandru Tănăsescu, CFR railroad industrial complex, Bucharest
1950 student dormitory in Câmpulung Moldovenesc

Selected publishing

References

Sources 

1896 births
1980 deaths
Romanian architects
Romanian women architects
20th-century Romanian architects